Carbonel: the King of the Cats is a children's book by Barbara Sleigh published in 1955 by Max Parrish in England and Bobbs-Merrill in the US. It is based on a folk tale from the British Isles "The King of the Cats" has two sequels, The Kingdom of Carbonel (Puffin, 1961) and Carbonel and Calidor: Being the Further Adventures of a Royal Cat (Kestrel Books, 1978), making up the Carbonel series. The first edition of Carbonel was illustrated by V. H. Drummond, and of Kingdom by D. M. Leonard.

Plot summary
A girl named Rosemary buys a broom and a cat from Mrs Cantrip, an untidy woman in the market place. When to Rosemary's surprise the cat starts talking to her, she learns that the woman is a witch, selling her possessions to start a new career.

Moreover, the cat, Carbonel, just happens to be King of the Cats, presumed missing by his subjects since the witch abducted him. Unfortunately, he cannot return to his throne until the enslavement spell Mrs Cantrip cast on him is undone. Rosemary, together with a new friend John, have to learn a little witchcraft themselves before tracking down Mrs Cantrip to obtain her at best ambivalent help.

Main characters
Rosemary Brown – who buys Carbonel
Carbonel – the cat protagonist
Rosemary's mother – a poor widow and seamstress
Mrs Cantrip – kidnapper of Carbonel and a (semi-retired) witch
John – Rosemary's friend, and the nephew of Mrs Brown's employer

Release details
1955, UK, Max Parrish ISBN ?, publication date 1955, paperback (first edition)
1957, UK, Atheneum , publication date January 1957, hardback 
1970, UK, Puffin Books , publication date 29 January 1970, paperback
1975, UK, Viking Children's Books , publication date 31 December 1975, hardback 
2004, US, New York Review of Books , publication date Nov 2004, hardback 
2005, UK, Puffin Books , publication date 25 August 2005

Carbonel (the first book) is currently in print in hardback in the US as part of the New York Review Children's Collection. The UK paperback was reprinted in August 2005 by Puffin.

References

1955 British novels
1955 fantasy novels
1955 children's books
British children's books
British children's novels
Children's fantasy novels
Novels about cats
Novels by Barbara Sleigh
Puffin Books books